Admiral Sir Alexander Noel Campbell Bingley,  (15 February 1905 – 28 September 1972) was a Royal Navy officer who served as Commander-in-Chief, Portsmouth and Allied Command Channel from 1961 to 1963.

Naval career
Bingley joined the Royal Navy as a cadet in 1918.

Bingley served in the Second World War on the staff of the Commander-in-Chief, Home Fleet. He went on to captain the aircraft carrier  in 1943, of the aircraft carrier  in 1944, and of the Mobile Naval Air Base HMS Nabaron in 1945.

After the war, Bingley was appointed Deputy Director of Air Warfare. He went on to be Chief of Staff to the Flag Officer (Air) and then Commander of the aircraft-carrier  in 1952. He was appointed Fifth Sea Lord and Deputy Chief of Naval Staff (Air) in 1954 and Flag Officer, Aircraft Carriers in 1958. He was made Commander-in-Chief, Mediterranean Fleet and NATO Commander Allied Forces Mediterranean in 1959 and then Commander-in-Chief, Portsmouth and Allied Commander-in-Chief, Channel in 1961; he retired in 1963.

Personal life
Bingley married Juliet Martin Vick in 1948. After his death she resumed her career as a social worker after a gap of 28 years, and was appointed a Member of the Order of the British Empire in 1970. They had three children, and lived at Hoddesdon in Hertfordshire.

References

|-

|-

|-

1905 births
1972 deaths
Royal Navy admirals
Knights Grand Cross of the Order of the Bath
Officers of the Order of the British Empire
Royal Navy officers of World War II
Lords of the Admiralty